Fellows may refer to Fellow, in plural form.

Fellows or Fellowes may also refer to:

Places
Fellows, California, USA
Fellows, Wisconsin, ghost town, USA

Other uses
Fellows Auctioneers, established in 1876.
Fellowes, Inc., manufacturer of workspace products
Fellows, a partner in the firm of English canal carriers, Fellows Morton & Clayton
Fellows (surname)

See also
North Fellows Historic District, listed on the National Register of Historic Places in Wapello County, Iowa
Justice Fellows (disambiguation)